Dalton Davis is a South African rugby union player, currently playing with French Fédérale 1 club Graulhet. His regular position is eighth man or flanker.

Career

Youth and Varsity Rugby

Eastern Province Kings

Griquas
He joined  during the 2013 Currie Cup Premier Division season.

L'Aquila
In October 2013, he joined Italian National Championship of Excellence side L'Aquila.

Decazeville
He joined French Fédérale 2 club Decazeville in August 2017.

References

South African rugby union players
Eastern Province Elephants players
Griquas (rugby union) players
Living people
1990 births
Rugby union number eights
Rugby union players from the Eastern Cape